Alvi Ahmetaj (born 12 July 1998) is an Albanian footballer who plays as a midfielder for Luftëtari Gjirokastër.

References
ben merkato te Luftetari , Afron Ahmetajn 
i Partizanit firmos kontrate 4 vjecare me Luftetarin
ahmetaj nga Luftetari

External links 

1998 births
Living people
Footballers from Gjirokastër
Albanian footballers
Association football midfielders
Albanian men's footballers
Albania youth international footballers
KF Tirana players
Luftëtari Gjirokastër players
Kategoria Superiore players